Éva Biszku (born 17 March 1953) is a Hungarian volleyball player. She competed in the women's tournament at the 1976 Summer Olympics. Her twin sister, Zsuzsa, was also on the Hungarian volleyball team at the same Olympics.

References

1953 births
Living people
Hungarian women's volleyball players
Olympic volleyball players of Hungary
Volleyball players at the 1976 Summer Olympics
Volleyball players from Budapest